The Shining Hour is a 1934 Broadway three-act drama written by Keith Winter, 
produced by Max Gordon and staged by Raymond Massey with scenic design created by Aubrey Hammond. It ran for 121 performances from February 13, 1934, to May 1934 at the Booth Theatre. This was 
Gladys Cooper's Broadway debut. Raymond Massey and Adrianne Allen were a married couple at this time.

The play was included in Burns Mantle's The Best Plays of 1933-1934.

It was adapted into the 1938 film The Shining Hour directed by Frank Borzage and starring Joan Crawford,
Robert Young, Margaret Sullavan and Melvyn Douglas.

Cast

 Adrianne Allen as Judy Linden	
 Gladys Cooper as Mariella Linden	
 Marjorie Fielding as Hannah Linden	
 Raymond Massey as	David Linden	
 Cyril Raymond as Henry Linden	
 Derek Williams as	Mickey Linden

References

External links 
 

1934 plays
Broadway plays
Plays set in England
American plays adapted into films